Zdzisław Kuźniar (born 26 July 1931, in Free City of Danzig, now Gdańsk, Poland) is a Polish theater, film and television actor.

Kuźniar graduated from the Ludwik Solski Academy for the Dramatic Arts in Kraków. That same year he debuted theatrically in the role of the butler prince in the play Intrigue and Love by Friedrich Schiller, directed by Alexander Gąssowskiego at the Polish Theatre in Poznań.

He has performed on many theatre stages in Poznań, Gdańsk, and Wrocław.

References

External links
 

1931 births
Living people
Male actors from Gdańsk
People from the Free City of Danzig
Polish male actors
Recipient of the Meritorious Activist of Culture badge